Lesmil (previously known as Summit) is an unincorporated community in Washington Township, Jackson County, Ohio, United States.

In 1860, there was a telegraph station located here on the Marietta and Cincinnati Railroad.

References 

Unincorporated communities in Jackson County, Ohio